Dizbad may refer to:
 Dizbad-e Olya
 Dizbad-e Sofla

See also
 Dizabad (disambiguation)